Richea is a genus of  11 species of flowering plants in the family Ericaceae. Nine of the species are endemic to Tasmania and the other two are endemic to the south-east of the Australian mainland.

Species include: 
Richea acerosa (Lindl.) F.Muell.
Richea alpina Menadue
Richea continentis B.L.Burtt – Candle heath 
Richea dracophylla R.Br. – Dragonleaf richea
Richea gunnii Hook.f. – Gunn's candle heath
Richea milliganii (Hook.f.) F.Muell. – Milligan's candle heath or nodding candle heath
Richea pandanifolia Hook.f. – Pandani or giant grass tree
Richea procera (F.Muell.) F.Muell. – Lowland richea
Richea scoparia Hook.f. – Scoparia
Richea sprengelioides (R.Br.) F.Muell.
Richea victoriana Menadue

References

 
Ericaceae genera